Wendy Rogers (born July 24, 1954) is an American far-right  politician serving as a member of the Arizona State Senate from the 7th legislative district and the Republican Party. Elected in November 2020, she assumed office on January 11, 2021. Rogers was an officer in the United States Air Force from 1976 to 1996.

An outspoken supporter of Donald Trump, Rogers led a successful primary challenge in 2020 against incumbent Republican state senator Sylvia Allen and defeated Democrat Felicia French in the general election. She had previously made five unsuccessful campaigns for public office.

Since her election, Rogers has emerged as a divisive and controversial figure, embracing inflammatory rhetoric including the Great Replacement conspiracy theory and appearing on TruNews. Rogers is a member of Oath Keepers, an anti-government militia whose members took part in the 2021 U.S. Capitol attack. Rogers has been described as a supporter of white nationalism.

In March 2022, the Republican-controlled Arizona Senate censured her for remarks she made at the white nationalist America First Political Action Conference, and weeks later opened an ethics inquiry after she suggested the 2022 Buffalo shooting was a false flag operation conducted by the federal government.

Early life and education 
Rogers was born in Fort Knox, Kentucky, on July 24, 1954. She holds a Bachelor of Social Work from Michigan State University, a Master of Social Work from the University of Alabama, and a Master of Science in national security studies from California State University, San Bernardino.

Career 
Rogers served in the United States Air Force from 1976 to 1996, retiring with the rank of lieutenant colonel. One of the first 100 female pilots in the Air Force, Rogers earned her flight wings in 1981 and went on to fly the C-141 Starlifter heavy military transport aircraft and C-21 "Learjet" transport. Rogers was later stationed in Europe. She currently owns a home inspection business.

Beginning in 2010, Rogers ran unsuccessfully for public office five times. In 2010, Rogers ran for the Arizona Senate in the 17th legislative district, losing to Democrat David Schapira in the general election. In 2012, she ran for the U.S. House of Representatives in Arizona's 9th congressional district, losing the Republican primary to Vernon Parker. In 2014, she ran again for the 9th district and won the Republican nomination, but lost to incumbent Democratic congresswoman Kyrsten Sinema. During that campaign, Rogers used footage of the beheading video of American journalist James Foley by ISIL terrorists in a campaign ad seeking to attack Sinema as weak on national security. Democrats condemned the ad as a "reprehensible" smear tactic, while Rogers's campaign defended it.

In 2016, Rogers unsuccessfully sought the Republican nomination for Arizona's 1st congressional district; she was one of a five-person field, along with Pinal County Sheriff Paul Babeu, former state Senator and Arizona Secretary of State Ken Bennett, rancher and businessman Gary Kiehne, and Shawn Redd. During her primary campaign, Rogers was the sole candidate to support Donald Trump's proposal to build a wall on the border with Mexico. She also supported increasing the number of U.S. military personnel deployed to foreign conflicts. Rogers lost, coming in third place behind Babeu, who won the nomination, and Kiehne, the runner-up. In 2018, Rogers ran again and won the Republican nomination for the 1st congressional district, but lost to incumbent Democratic congressman Tom O'Halleran.

State Senate election and tenure 
In 2020, Rogers ran for the Arizona Senate in the 6th legislative district, which encompasses Rim Country and the White Mountains, and extends from Flagstaff to the Arizona–New Mexico border. Rogers unseated longtime Republican incumbent Sylvia Allen in a bitterly contested primary election, and defeated Democratic nominee Felicia French in the general election. During the campaign, Rogers made few public appearances and did not participate in debates; she also avoided taking positions on local political issues, such as forest management, education funding, or Arizona's response to the COVID-19 pandemic. Dark money organizations on both sides spent large sums to support and oppose the two candidates. Rogers raised $1 million in campaign contributions, a record for the district.

Rogers is Vice Chairman of the Arizona Senate Judiciary Committee, a member of the Senate's Health and Human Services Committee and Natural Resources, Energy and Water Committee, and a member of the legislature's joint Blockchain and Cryptocurrency Study Committee.

Support for overturning the 2020 presidential election 

Following the 2020 United States presidential election, in which President Donald Trump was defeated by Joe Biden, Rogers promoted the false claim that Trump had won the election nationally and in Arizona. As Arizona's slate of electors met in Phoenix to formally cast the state's electoral votes for Biden, Rogers tweeted "Buy more ammo." Arizona Secretary of State Katie Hobbs condemned Rogers's statement.

After a mob of Trump supporters attacked the U.S. Capitol in January 2021 in a failed attempt to halt the counting of the electoral votes and keep Trump in power, Rogers falsely claimed the attack had been conducted by antifa groups. Rogers was one of a number of Republican state legislators in Arizona who either defended and excused the attempted insurrection, or spread disinformation about responsibility for the attack.

Rogers strongly supported the 2021 Maricopa County presidential ballot audit initiated by Arizona Senate Republicans to challenge Joe Biden's victory in the county and the state. She promoted the review extensively on social media, which helped her gain a large following. The results had previously been repeatedly recounted, with no discrepancies found. After the audit found no proof of election fraud, and that Biden's margin of victory was actually larger, Rogers began a campaign to audit elections in all 50 states and called for each state to "decertify its electors where it has been shown the elections were certified prematurely and inaccurately". She is one of two Arizona legislators endorsed for reelection by former President Donald Trump.

Legislation 
In 2021, during the COVID-19 pandemic in Arizona, Rogers sponsored legislation to declare gun shops "essential businesses" permitted to remain open during emergencies. In February 2021, Rogers sponsored legislation seeking to rename a portion of Arizona State Route 260 as the "Donald J. Trump Highway", which State Senator Martin Quezada, a Democrat from Phoenix, described as "a desperate attempt to really pander to a base of voters even though the state of Arizona rejected Donald Trump". In the legislature, Rogers has introduced anti-abortion measures.

In January 2022, Rogers proposed a bill that, if accepted, would make Arizona the first state to accept Bitcoin as legal tender, though doubts were raised about its compliance with the Contract Clause of the United States Constitution. Rogers subsequently introduced legislation to allow state agencies to accept cryptocurrencies in the payment of debts, and to exclude cryptocurrencies from Arizona taxes.

2022 Re-election 
Rogers successfully ran for re-election to the Arizona Senate in 7th legislative district as a result of a "last-minute change" by Arizona's Independent Redistricting Commission, which altered the district boundaries in Flagstaff, where Rogers resides. Rogers was endorsed by former president Donald Trump.

In January 2022, it was reported that Rogers had raised a "record-breaking" $2.5 million for her re-election campaign. Rogers defeated fellow incumbent Arizona Senator Kelly Townsend in the Republican primary by an 18-point margin, receiving 59 percent of the vote to Townsend's 41 percent. Townsend initially conceded to Rogers, before threatening a lawsuit to overturn the election results.

Rogers faced Democrat Kyle Nitschke in the general election, winning a second term with 64% of the vote.

Controversies

Defamation lawsuit 
While running for Congress in 2018, Rogers ran ads attacking one of her Republican primary opponents, Steve Smith, calling him a "slimy character" and linking his employer, a modeling agency, to "websites linked to sex trafficking". The modeling agency and its owner sued Rogers for defamation in October 2018. In a 4–3 decision issued in February 2022, the Supreme Court ruled that Rogers's ad was protected by the First Amendment. The majority of the court ruled that allowing the case to proceed would "inevitably and intolerably chill political speech" by opening the door to lawsuits by "any third party who might indirectly be identified in a passing reference in a political advertisement"; the dissenting justices criticized the decision, writing that it "effectively weaponizes the First Amendment against innocent bystanders ensnared by often-vitriolic political campaigns, disregards well-established precedent, and is unnecessary for protecting political speech."

Ethics investigations 
In January 2021, Michael Polloni, a former legislative aide to Rogers, filed a complaint with the Arizona State Senate Ethics Committee accusing Rogers of abusive workplace conduct. In his complaint, Polloni claimed that Rogers subjected him to verbal abuse, removed and damaged his belongings, demanded that he perform campaign work on government time, and demanded that he work while on sick leave for COVID-19. An investigation by a Senate attorney found that Rogers cursed at Polloni during a heated argument, but found "little evidence" to corroborate other claims. In March 2021, the Republican-led Ethics Committee dismissed the complaint, finding no clear and convincing evidence of an ethics violation. Both Democrats on the Committee disagreed with the decision. Polloni subsequently filed a $500,000 notice of claim (a precursor to a lawsuit) against the state, alleging wrongful termination and harassment. In December 2021, Polloni filed suit in Maricopa County Superior Court, alleging wrongful termination, assault and emotional distress.

Following the May 2022 mass shooting in Buffalo, New York, Rogers suggested on a social media site that the shooting was a false flag operation perpetrated by federal agents. The Republican-controlled Arizona Senate voted two days later by a margin of 24–3 to open an ethics investigation of Rogers over the social media comment. Rogers was one of the three Republicans who voted against the investigation.

Censure by the Arizona Senate 
On March 1, 2022, Republican Arizona Senate Majority Leader Rick Gray moved to censure Rogers for "conduct unbecoming of a senator, including publicly issuing and promoting social media and video messages encouraging violence". The motion was brought in response to Rogers's February 25 speech to the America First Political Action Conference, in which she called for the public execution of political "traitors". On the Senate floor, Rogers refused to apologize or "back down" and accused Senate Republican leadership of "colluding with the Democrats". Rogers had previously threatened to "destroy the careers" of any Republican Senators who voted to censure her. The motion passed 24–3, with Rogers and two other senators voting no. Rogers's censure was the first such successful motion in three decades.

Embrace of far-right extremism 
In 2018, Rogers claimed to be a "charter member" of the Oath Keepers, a militia group known to promote conspiracy theories and violent, extremist rhetoric, including talk of a new civil war. During her 2020 campaign for the Arizona Senate, she promoted her membership in the group. After the January 6, 2021 attack on the U.S. Capitol, which resulted in criminal indictments for 26 members of the Oath Keepers, Rogers stated on Twitter: "I am a member of the Oathkeepers and I really like their dedication to our Constitution and to our country," and included a photo of her speaking to the Cottonwood chapter of the organization.

In December 2020, as a State Senator-elect, Rogers praised Confederate general Robert E. Lee as a "great patriot and a great leader". In June 2021, Rogers appeared on the streaming channel TruNews on a show hosted by Christian nationalist commentator and politician, Lauren Witzke. TruNews, along with its founder Rick Wiles, is known for its promotion of antisemitic conspiracy theories, including a claim Trump's impeachment was orchestrated by "seditious Jews" and that Americans are "oppressed by Jewish tyrants". In July 2021, Rogers claimed that "Americans who love this country" are "being replaced [...] using mass immigration, education, big tech, big corporations" and "other strategies", echoing the Great Replacement conspiracy theory. Rogers has promoted antisemitic conspiracy theories and made antisemitic comments. She denounced Ukrainian President Volodymyr Zelensky as "a globalist puppet for Soros and the Clintons."

Rogers spoke at the America First Political Action Conference in 2022. During her speech, Rogers praised the white supremacist event host Nick Fuentes, calling him "the most persecuted man in America." Rogers had previously stated to Fuentes on Twitter "We love you." After the conference concluded, Rogers praised white nationalist Vincent James Foxx and suggested he run for political office.

In June 2022, QAnon conspiracy theorist Ron Watkins filed a formal ethics complaint against Rogers with the Arizona Senate. In support of his complaint, Watkins cited Rogers' request on the instant messaging service Telegram for the Groypers to "hit" Watkins after he alleged that Rogers had cut a "backroom deal" to prevent election equipment from being examined.

Personal life 
Rogers married Hal Kunnen in 1978 and they have two children. Kunnen is a retired Air Force officer.

Bibliography

References

External links 

 Official Arizona Senate profile
 Biography at Ballotpedia

Living people
Arizona Republicans
Republican Party Arizona state senators
21st-century American politicians
21st-century American women politicians
Women in the United States Air Force
American women aviators
Aviators from Kentucky
Far-right politicians in the United States
Michigan State University alumni
University of Alabama alumni
California State University, San Bernardino alumni
Women state legislators in Arizona
Candidates in the 2010 United States elections
Candidates in the 2012 United States elections
Candidates in the 2014 United States elections
Candidates in the 2016 United States elections
Candidates in the 2018 United States elections
Women military aviators
1954 births
Members of the Oath Keepers